The Schola Cantorum Basiliensis (SCB) is a music academy and research institution located in Basel, Switzerland, that focuses on early music and historically informed performance. Faculty at the school have organized performing ensembles that have made notable recordings of early music. One of the more popular of these is the 1994 album Chill to the Chant.

History

Paul Sacher founded the school in 1933. Influential faculty included August Wenzinger (cello and viola da gamba), Ina Lohr (violin), and Max Meili (vocal music). In 1954 the Schola merged with two other Basel music schools to form the City of Basel Music Academy.

Faculty

Among the school's other notable faculty members, past and present, are musicians from many countries. By nationality, they include:
 Australia: keyboardist and conductor Geoffrey Lancaster
 Belgium: countertenor and conductor René Jacobs
 England: lutenist and ensemble leader Anthony Rooley; soprano Evelyn Tubb; viola da gambist Alison Crum
 France: cellist and conductor Christophe Coin; flautist Marc Hantaï; conductor Dominique Vellard
 Germany: flautist/recorder player and conductor Hans-Martin Linde; countertenor Andreas Scholl; tenor Gerd Türk; viola da gambist  Veronica Hampe
 Italy: organist Lorenzo Ghielmi, organist, harpsichordist and conductor Andrea Marcon; harpsichordist Francesco Corti; viola da gambist Paolo Pandolfo
 Netherlands: cantor and conductor Jan Boeke; harpsichordist, organist and conductor Gustav Leonhardt; violinist Jaap Schröder; sackbuttist Charles Toet; cantor and gambist Henk Waardenburg; flautist, gambist and music therapist Wil Waardenburg.
 Portugal: lutenist and conductor Manuel Morais
 Spain: viola da gambist and conductor Jordi Savall
 Switzerland: violinist and conductor Chiara Banchini; violist da gambist and cellist Hannelore Mueller; baritone Kurt Widmer
 United States of America: bassoonist Donna Agrell, lutenists Hopkinson Smith and Crawford Young; cornettist Bruce Dickey; and trumpeter Edward H. Tarr.

Alumni

Notable alumni have included such musicians such as Gustav Leonhardt, Jordi Savall, Barbara Thornton, Christina Pluhar, Elam Rotem, Jorge Guerrero Dantur and Benjamin Bagby.

Lutenists

Lutenists who have studied at the Schola include:
 
 Robert Barto (b. USA; studied with Eugen Müller-Dombois)
 Luciano Contini (b. Italy; studied with Eugen Müller-Dombois and Hopkinson Smith)
 Eduardo Egüez (b. Argentina; studied with Hopkinson Smith)
 Paul O'Dette (b. USA; studied with Eugen Müller-Dombois and Thomas Binkley)
 Anthony Bailes (b. Great Britain; studied with Eugen Müller-Dombois)
 Toyohiko Satoh (b. Japan; studied with Eugen Müller-Dombois)
 Manuel Morais (b. Portugal; studied with Eugen Müller-Dombois)
 Edin Karamazov (b. Bosnia-Herzogovina; studied with Hopkinson Smith)
 Marc Lewon (b. Germany, studied with Crawford Young)
 Rolf Lislevand (b. Norway; studied with Eugen Müller-Dombois and Hopkinson Smith)
 Evangelina Mascardi (b. Argentina; studied with Hopkinson Smith)
 Rafael Benatar (b. Venezuela; studied with Eugen Müller-Dombois and Hopkinson Smith)

See also 
:Category:Schola Cantorum Basiliensis alumni
:Category:Academic staff of Schola Cantorum Basiliensis

References

External links
Schola Cantorum Basiliensis page at bach-cantatas.com

 
Educational institutions established in 1933
Mixed early music groups
Culture in Basel
1933 establishments in Switzerland